Live at the Village Vanguard Vol. III is a live album by Paul Motian's Trio 2000 + Two, recorded at the Village Vanguard and released by Winter & Winter Records in 2010. It is the final volume of the series, and features tenor saxophonist Chris Potter, double bassist Larry Grenadier, pianist Masabumi Kikuchi and violist Mat Maneri (in place of a second saxophonist).

Reception

In a review for All About Jazz, Charles Walker commented: "Volume III finds the band refining its sound, boiling down its book of highly original music from the unfettered antics of past interactions into a more centered whole."

Mike Hobart of the Financial Times wrote that Potter and Maneri "combine warmly on saxophone and cello to bring out the full lyricism of Motian's unhurried themes, and then edge inexorably towards darker-centred improvisation. Motian knowingly orchestrates with subtle adjustments of tension and tempo, his rhythmic swirls, swishy cymbals and spacious beats compelling accompaniment."

Track listing
All compositions by Paul Motian (Yazgol Music, BMI) except as indicated
 "And So To Sleep Again" - 8:46 (Joe Marsala/Sunny Skylar)
 "Ten" - 11:10
 "The Third Walk" - 9:46
 "The Hoax" - 8:23
 "Gang of 5" - 11:43
 "Standard Time" - 8:50
Recorded at the Village Vanguard in New York City on December 8–10, 2006

Personnel
Paul Motian - drums
Chris Potter - tenor saxophone
Larry Grenadier - double bass

Masabumi Kikuchi - piano
Mat Maneri - viola

References 

2010 live albums
Paul Motian live albums
Winter & Winter Records live albums
Albums recorded at the Village Vanguard